Philip A. Lehman (born November 3, 1946) is an American politician. He was appointed to the North Carolina House of Representatives in 2017 following the death of Paul Luebke. A Democrat, he served the 30th district.

Committee assignments
Environment
Finance
Judiciary III
Pensions and Retirement
State and Local Government II

References

Living people
1946 births
Place of birth missing (living people)
Politicians from Durham, North Carolina
21st-century American politicians
Democratic Party members of the North Carolina House of Representatives